Mya Than Tint (23 May 1929 – 18 February 1998) was a five-time Myanmar National Literature Award winning Burmese writer and translator.

Biography
Born Mya Than on 23 May 1929 in Myaing, Pakokku Township, Magway Division, Myanmar, he was the eldest of seven children to Paw Tint and his wife Hlaing.

Mya Than Tint entered Rangoon University in 1948, the year Burma gained independence from Great Britain, and received a degree in philosophy, political science and English literature in 1954.

His writing career began in 1949 when his first short novel “Refugee” was published in Tara Magazine (No. 21, Vol. 3, 1949). His first translated work was Malva and other short stories by Gorky.He published many short and full-length novels, documentaries and translated works in his 50-year writing career.

Dataung Ko Kyaw Ywei, Mee Pinle Ko Hpyat Myi  (Across the Mountain of Swords and the Sea of Fire) (1973) is considered to be his greatest masterpiece. He also wrote historical documentaries like “Breeze over Taungthaman Lake”.

Also a prolific translator of Western literature into Burmese, Mya Than Tint introduced his readers to world classics like War and Peace, Gone with the Wind (လေရူးသုန်သုန်), and Dream of the Red Chamber. He won the Myanmar National Literature Award five times for translation War and Peace(1972), Gone with the Wind (1978), Dream of the Red Chamber (1988), City of Joy (1992) and Beyond Love (1995).

As a political prisoner, Mya Than Tint was jailed from 1963 to 1972 by Ne Win's military regime that seized power from a democratic government in 1962. He was initially incarcerated in Rangoon's notorious Insein Prison, but later transferred with other political prisoners to the Coco Islands penal colony in the Indian Ocean until his release three years later. At the age of 68, he died in his home in Sanchaung Township in Rangoon of a brain hemorrhage after an accidental fall from a staircase in the early morning of February 18, 1998. He was cremated at the Hteinpin cemetery in Rangoon.

Literary works 
Famous Burmese Novels by Mya Than Tint:
Myit-tar Athinchay-Infinite Love
 Dataung Ko Kyaw Ywei, Mee Pinle Ko Hpyat Myi - Across the Mountain of Swords and the Sea of Fire (1973)
 A-hmaung Yeik We - In the Dark Shadow (1960)
 Annyattara Yoke Pon Hlwa - Images of Ordinary People
 Like Hkedaw Mya Nanda - Run with me, Mya Nanda (1960)
 Khit Pyaing Yoke Pon Hlwa  - Images of Our Modern Era
 Pondaung Ponnya Thwa Tawla  - Travelogue of Pondaung Ponnya
 Taungthaman Shwe Inn ga Lei-hnyin Sawdaw - Breeze over Taungthaman Lake (1999)
 "The City of Joy"
 "Than Chaung"
 "Kankaung"
 "Khuntaw Satye Chinthaw Wutthumyar" ( The Stories I wanna continue writing)
 "Myanmar:The longest war" 2015
 "The Art of Writing"

His collection of short stories  Annyattara Yoke Pon Hlwa  (Images of Ordinary People) has been translated in English titled On the Road to Mandalay.

Translations
Well Known Works of Translation into Burmese:

Sherlock Holmes series into 5 Volumes -

The Adventures of Sherlock Holmes
The Memoirs of Sherlock Holmes
The Return of Sherlock Holmes
His Last Bow
The Case-Book of Sherlock Holmes

Quotes
"Since my childhood, I have believed that writing is the most honourable job, and honour doesn’t mean material wealth, but honest and truthful dignity."
 "I will not exchange my job as a writer for anything."
 "I wouldn’t do now, I won’t do in the future."

References

External links
Book review: On the Road to Mandalay Martin Morland, September 1996
On the Road to Mandalay: Tales of Ordinary People Mya Than Tint
Controversial Novel Finally Cleared The Back Page (June 2005), The Irrawaddy

1929 births
1998 deaths
People from Magway Division
Burmese writers
University of Yangon alumni
Burmese prisoners and detainees
Burmese translators